Carlos Eduardo Pignatari (born 9 April 1959 in Votuporanga), mostly known as Carlão Pignatari, is a Brazilian entrepreneur and politician, member of the Brazilian Social Democracy Party (PSDB).

He was Mayor of Votuporanga for two terms and, in the 2018 state elections, Pignatari was elect state deputy of the state of São Paulo for the third time.

Biography
Born in the municipality of Votuporanga, Carlos Pignatari is married to Marli Beneduzzi, whom they have four children and one grandson. He began his political career at the age of 33, when he joined PSDB in 1992. Pignatari was regional coordinator of Mário Covas campaign for Governor in 1994.

Electoral history

References

External links
 

|-

|-

|-

1959 births
Living people
People from Votuporanga
Brazilian Social Democracy Party politicians
Members of the Legislative Assembly of São Paulo